Pratapa icetoides, the blue royal, is a species of blue butterfly (Lycaenidae) found in the Indomalayan realm.

Range
The butterfly occurs in India from Assam, the Khasi Hills, eastwards and across to north and south Myanmar, Thailand, Peninsular Malaysia, Singapore, Java, Borneo, Sumatra, Sulawesi and Nias.

Subspecies
P. i. icetoides North India, Burma, North Thailand, Assam, Burma
P. i. cretheus  (de Nicéville, 1895)  Sumatra, W.Java
P. i. carmentalis  (de Nicéville, [1893])  Khasia Hills
P. i.  yasa  (Fruhstorfer, 1912)  Nias
P. i. ecphanathus  (Fruhstorfer, 1912)   East Java
P. i. calculis  Druce, 1895  South Thailand, Peninsular Malaya, Singapore, Borneo
P. i. marikit  Schröder & Treadaway, 1986 Philippines, Palawan

Taxonomy
The butterfly was previously classified as Camena icetoides and Ancema icetoides.

Status
William Harry Evans in 1932 and Mark Alexander Wynter-Blyth in 1957 both describe the species as not being rare.

Description

The butterfly has a wingspan of 30 to 32 mm.

The male white-banded royal above is a shining bright blue up to base of 4 in the forewing. On the hindwing is a mid-costal white patch. The male has a large but inconspicuous brand on the upperside of the hindwing. The female is a pale dull powdery blue with a broad black border on both wings. The underside is pale brown with no bars end cell. The forewing has an outwardly white-edged discal line curved inwards.

See also
List of butterflies of India (Lycaenidae)

Cited references

References
  
 
 
 
 
 Yutaka Inayoshi, A Check List of Butterflies in Indo-China'', page on Family Lycaenidae (accessed 7 August 2007).

Pratapa
Butterflies of Asia
Butterflies of Borneo
Butterflies described in 1892